Geoffrey Brooke (14 June 1884 – 26 June 1966) was a British equestrian. He competed in two events at the 1924 Summer Olympics.

References

External links
 

1884 births
1966 deaths
British male equestrians
Olympic equestrians of Great Britain
Equestrians at the 1924 Summer Olympics
Sportspeople from Dublin (city)